The Sixth Amendment of the Constitution (Adoption) Act 1979 is an amendment to the Constitution of Ireland ensured that certain adoption orders would not be found to be unconstitutional because they had not been made by a court. It was approved by referendum on 5 July 1979 and signed into law on 3 August 1979.

Background
In 1977 it came to light that for technical reasons child adoption orders made by An Bord Uchtála (the Adoption Board) might be found to be unconstitutional because they were not made by a court or judge. An amendment was therefore required to put the validity of these orders beyond question.

Changes to the text
The amendment renumbered Article 37 as Article 37.1 and inserted the following section as Article 37.2:

Oireachtas debate
The Sixth Amendment of the Constitution (Adoption) Bill 1978 was introduced by Fianna Fáil Minister for Justice Gerry Collins on 13 December 1978. It was supported by opposition parties Fine Gael and the Labour Party and it passed final stages in the Dáil on 28 February 1979. In the Seanad, Labour senators Justin Keating and Mary Robinson and Fine Gael senator Alexis FitzGerald proposed an amendment to include the words "notwithstanding the status of such person", which would allow for the adoption of a child of a marital family. This was not approved, and the Bill passed the Seanad without amendment on 5 April 1979. It was put to a referendum on 5 July, on the same day as the similarly uncontroversial Seventh Amendment which dealt with university constituencies for the election of the Seanad.

Result
The Sixth Amendment was approved almost unanimously with 601,694 (99.0%) votes in favour and 6,265 (1.0%) against. This is the highest support there has been in any referendum for a proposal to amend the Constitution. It was also the lowest turnout for any referendum.

Note: For this referendum and the Seventh Amendment held on the same day, the constituencies used were each county and county borough (city), which were deemed under section 2 of the Referendum (Amendment) Act 1979 to be constituencies for the purpose of the poll. Usually in Irish referendums the general election constituencies are used.

Later developments
The Thirty-first Amendment of the Constitution of Ireland, which took effect in 2015, added a new Article 42A on Children. It included a section which allowed for the adoption of any child, allowing for the first time the adoption of children of a marital family, as had been proposed in the amendment rejected in the Seanad in 1979. The new Article 42A.3 provided,

See also
Politics of the Republic of Ireland
History of the Republic of Ireland
Constitutional amendment
1979 Irish constitutional referendums
Amendments to the Constitution of Ireland

References

External links
Sixth Amendment of the Constitution Act 1979
Full text of the Constitution of Ireland

1979 in Irish law
1979 in Irish politics
1979 referendums
Adoption law
06
Family law in the Republic of Ireland
06
July 1979 events in Europe
Amendment, 06